Mian Muhammad Ateeq Shaikh is a Pakistani politician and a member of Senate of Pakistan, affiliated with the Mutahidda Qaumi Movement. He was born in Dubai and raised in Islamabad.

He is a businessman by profession and is the founder and chief executive of the Shalimar Group of Companies.

Political career
Shaikh began his political career by joining the Muttahida Qaumi Movement in 2012.

He became a member of the central executive committee of the Muttahidda Qaumi Movement before becoming a member of the coordination committee in 2013.

In 2014, he became the first president of the Muttahidda Qaumi Movement chapter in Punjab.

In 2015, he was selected by the Muttahidda Qaumi Movement to run for the seat of Senate of Pakistan in 2015 Pakistani Senate election from Sindh. Some members of the MQM questioned the decision of Altaf Hussain to give the ticket to Shaikh to run in the Senate election from Sindh despite the fact that he hails from Punjab. 

He was elected to the Senate of Pakistan for the first time in 2015 Pakistani Senate election as a candidate of Muttahidda Qaumi Movement. In March 2021, his tenure as a member of the Senate ended.

References

Living people
Pakistani senators (14th Parliament)
Muttahida Qaumi Movement politicians
Year of birth missing (living people)